Greg Lambert may refer to:

 Greg Lambert (footballer) (born 1947), former Australian rules footballer
 Greg Lambert (cricketer) (born 1980), English cricketer